Khamsiyah binti Yeop is a Malaysian politician and former Deputy Minister of Entrepreneur and Co-operatives Development.

Election results

Honours
  :
  Knight Commander of the Order of the Perak State Crown (DPMP) - Dato' (2001)

References

1944 births
Living people
People from Perak
United Malays National Organisation politicians
Members of the Dewan Rakyat
Women members of the Dewan Rakyat
Members of the Perak State Legislative Assembly
Women MLAs in Perak